The 1953–54 Mexican Segunda División was the fourth season of the Mexican Segunda División. The season started on 9 August 1953 and concluded on 24 January 1954. It was won by Irapuato.

Initially, 13 teams took part in the competition. However, on 11 October 1953, after a match against San Sebastián, the bus that transported the squad of Veracruz suffered an accident and some of the players died. After this incident, Veracruz was dissolved and all the matches played by the club were annulled.

Teams

League table

Results

Notes
<div style="font-size: 90%;">
1. Match awarded to La Piedad.
</div style>

References

1953–54 in Mexican football
Segunda División de México seasons